Djedda is a sub-prefecture of Batha Region in Chad.

References 

Populated places in Chad